snRNA-activating protein complex subunit 1 is a protein that in humans is encoded by the SNAPC1 gene.

Interactions
SNAPC1 has been shown to interact with SNAPC4, SNAPC3 and Retinoblastoma protein.

References

Further reading